The 1971 Tirreno–Adriatico was the sixth edition of the Tirreno–Adriatico cycle race and was held from 10 March to 14 March 1971. The race started in Ladispoli and finished in San Benedetto del Tronto. The race was won by Italo Zilioli.

General classification

References

1971
1971 in Italian sport